Tetranodus is a genus of beetles in the family Cerambycidae, containing the following species:

 Tetranodus angulicollis Chemsak, 1969
 Tetranodus copei Chemsak & Linsley, 1988
 Tetranodus niveicollis Linell, 1897
 Tetranodus reticeps (Bates, 1880)
 Tetranodus rugipennis Chemsak, 1969
 Tetranodus tropipennis Chemsak, 1977
 Tetranodus xanthocollis Chemsak, 1977

References

Tillomorphini